Frank C. Pierce  (April 1883 – February 25, 1908) was an American track and field athlete from the Seneca Nation who competed in the 1904 Summer Olympics. In 1904 he did not finish in marathon competition. Pierce became the first Native American to compete for the United States in the Olympic Games.

References

External links
 
 

1883 births
1908 deaths
American male marathon runners
Olympic track and field athletes of the United States
Athletes (track and field) at the 1904 Summer Olympics